Harssens is a former town located in Groningen, Netherlands.

It was already established in the 14th century with a coat of arms of a blue 'griffioen' (winged, lanky, standing lion figure). In 1604 when Warmolus Hilbrandus addressed Kaiser Rudolf II of the Holy Roman Empire the Kaiser made Hildbrandus lord of the estate and recognized the coat of arms. By 1742 the Hilbrandus manor and the church in Harssens were dismantled. The rights to the coat of arms remained and when Adorp was established as a township in 1809 the winged lion of Harssens had a place of honour in the town crest.

Harssens is no longer a town but there are plans to rebuild the estate or Harssensborg as a tourist attraction.

References 

Populated places in Groningen (province)